Chico's may refer to:
 Chico's Bail Bonds, fictional company in the film The Bad News Bears
 Chico's Tacos, restaurant chain in El Paso, Texas
 Chico's (clothing retailer), women's apparel retailer

See also
Chico (disambiguation)